"The Case for the Defence" is a short story by Graham Greene which is about a case which takes unusual turns. Published in 1939, it is a part of the short-story collection Twenty-One Stories.

Summary

"The Case for the Defence" tells the story of a case known as the "Peckham Murder", in which an old woman named Mrs. Parker has been murdered in the middle of the night by a heavy stout man named Mr. Adams. There are several witnesses, the main one being Mrs. Salmon, who glimpsed Mr. Adams' face after seeing him on the steps of Mrs. Parker's house hiding a hammer. At the trial, Mrs. Salmon presents her account firmly and honestly, and is confident that the heavy man in the dock is Mr. Adams. She presented her testimony with honesty, care, and concern. This leads to a positive appearance towards Mrs. Salmon. However, she becomes flustered when the man's counsel presents to her an identical-looking man at the back of the courtroom, who is revealed to be his twin brother. None of the other witnesses can swear that the Adams twin in the dock is the Adams they had seen on the night of the murder, and both twins have alibis, that each was with his wife at the time. The twin in the dock is thus acquitted for lack of evidence. Then, as the twins are leaving the courtroom, a freak accident sees one of them pushed in front of a bus and killed, thus deepening the mystery of the "Peckham Murder". The author concludes the story with the question: "If you were Mrs. Salmon, could you sleep at night?"

1939 short stories
Thriller short stories
Novels by Graham Greene